Seven Mile Beach (SMB) is a long crescent of coral-sand beach on the western end of Grand Cayman island. Seven Mile Beach is known for its beauty, receiving the honor of "The Caribbean's Best Beach" in 2015 from Caribbean Travel and Life Magazine. It is public property (Because of the rule from the high tide down is public ) and one is able to walk the full length of the beach, regardless of where you are staying. The Seven Mile Beach is the most popular and most developed area of Grand Cayman. It is home to the majority of the island's luxury resorts and hotels. A realistic length for the uninterrupted sandy beach is about 6 miles. The beach falls victim to annual erosion, which has reduced its size in some areas, and may have reduced its length at the ends. Like the rest of Grand Cayman, the development around the Seven Mile Beach was severely damaged in Hurricane Ivan in September 2004 but many condominiums & hotels are still running at full capacity.

Restaurants open to the public can be found at most of the resorts, which includes several public beach bars. Some small reefs are located just off shore which offer good snorkelling, most notably by the Marriott hotel (an artificial reef), Government House (the Governor's residence), and just north of Seven Mile Public beach. 

Directly to the south of Seven Mile Beach is George Town, the capital city of the Cayman Islands and where the tourists come in, while to the north is the district of West Bay, which features a turtle farm and the limestone formations of Hell. Right across from Seven Mile Beach, is Camana Bay, a small town that also acts as a large shopping and office park. There are many amenities, with restaurants, cafés, and a cinema.

References

George Town, Cayman Islands
Beaches of the Cayman Islands